Setganga is a tourist destination of the Mungeli district in the Indian state of Chhattisgarh.

Temples 
It is mainly known for the Shri Ram Janki temple, The temple here was built in the 9th-10th century. The temple is best known for its gatekeeper, the demon king of Lanka, Ravana.

Geography 

References

 Villages in Mungeli district